Sanyi could refer to the following places in mainland China or Taiwan:

Sanyi, Mengcheng County (三义镇), town in Mengcheng County, Anhui
Sanyi Township, Pengshui County (三义乡), in Pengshui Miao and Tujia Autonomous County, Chongqing
Sanyi Township, Fuyu County, Jilin (三义乡), in Fuyu County, Jilin
Sanyi, Miaoli (三義鄉), township in Miaoli County, Taiwan

See also
Siyi
Sándor, a Hungarian name